Senior Officer Present Afloat, usually referred to as SOPA, is a U.S. Navy term to indicate the U.S. Navy officer, with the highest ranking by rank, or number in rank, present in a harbor occupied by more than one U.S. Navy vessel. That officer is essentially commander of all U.S. Navy operations afloat in the harbor and is responsible to civilian authorities for the action of the ships and the behavior of crews under his or her command.

SOPA is a useful administrative function in foreign ports visited by U.S. Navy vessels. However, SOPA may also be established in continental U.S. ports.

Examples of SOPA assignment  
 A U.S. Navy minesweeper enters the harbor of Sasebo, Japan, where there are a number of U.S. Navy destroyers at anchor. The captain of the minesweeper is a lieutenant commander who, informed by message beforehand as to who is SOPA, must report to the higher-ranking SOPA, a commander, located on one of the destroyers. The SOPA will assign the minesweeper instructions as to where to anchor or dock, and instruct the minesweeper on guard duty, mail runs, boat runs, radio watch, signal light watch, liberty procedures, shore patrol assignments, and other assigned shared duties.
 A cruiser with a higher-ranking Navy officer, such as a captain, enters the same port. The commanding officer of the cruiser immediately becomes SOPA and issues its own instructions and assignments.
 During periods of cooperation between Allied navies, such as during World War II or the Korean War, the Allied officer with the highest ranking assumes the position of SOPA. In such cases, for example, the captain of a Royal Navy destroyer may be SOPA and have responsibility for smaller U.S. Navy vessels under his jurisdiction.

Example of use 
See

SOP(A) 
SOP(A) is the term used for "Senior Officer Present (Ashore)."

References 
 http://www.cnrma.navy.mil/instructions/sopa/SOPA%20INTRODUCTION.pdf duties of SOPA, and in his absence, SOPA will be assigned to. the next senior embarked command...
 http://www.history.navy.mil/books/OPNAV20-P1000/S.htm SOPA

Military appointments
Military units and formations of the United States Navy
+